This is a tentative List of islands of Madagascar. This list is incomplete.

Inhabited islands
Ankify
Barren Isles (Nosy Barren)
Juan de Nova Island
Île aux Nattes (Nosy Nato)
Nosy Be
Nosy Berafia -  10 km long and 3 km wide. Its chief town is Antananabe.
Nosy Faly
Nosy Hara National Park
Nosy Komba
Nosy Mitsio
Nosy Tanihely National Park
Nosy Tsarabanjina
Nosy Ve-Androka National Park (23°38’S, 43°42’E)
Île Sainte-Marie (Nosy Boraha)

Uninhabited islands
Europa Island (Nosy Ampela)
Grande Glorieuse
Île du Lys
Nosy Mangabe - Antongil Bay, near Maroantsetra.
Nosy Hara
Nosy Tanihely - 341 ha. It is located 8.5 km South of Nosy Be.
Nosy Ve-Androka National Park
Nosy Antafana (in Analanjirofo, East coast, part of Mananara-Nord National Park)
Nosy Hely (in Analanjirofo, East coast, part of Mananara-Nord National Park)
Nosy Rangontsy (in Analanjirofo, East coast, part of Mananara-Nord National Park)Nosy 
Nosy Manitsa (also called: Nosy Manitse)- an island of 110 ha in the mouth of the Linta River, in Atsimo-Andrefana.

Unknown status
Nosindola (21°41’S, 43°20’E)
Nosy Adramona (21°39’S, 43°22’E) (Translated: Ramona island). 30 ha, heights 15 m, North of  Morombe about 6 km from cape Antsaramanefitra.
Nosy Adranombala (21°57’S, 43°11’E) - 5 km from Cape Saint-Vincent, 50 ha, heights: 13 meters.
Nosy Andambatihy (22°01’S, 43°14’E) : next to Nosy Ve. Accessible from Andabotibe, former site of Andavadoaka.
Nosy Antanimora -  northern Madagascar, near Nosy Be
Nosy Bemoka (22°00’S, 43°14’E) (translated: Island full of Mosquitos). South of Cape Saint-Vincent, in direction of Andavadoaka. 
Nosy Ovy or Nosy Barafia - northern Madagascar, near Nosy Be
Nosy Bevato (translated: Big Rock island) - Bay of Tsingilofilo, south of Morombe
Nosy Faly, northern Madagascar.
Nosy Fasy (22°03’S, 43°11’E) ( translated: Sandy island) North of Nosy Hao near Andavadoaka.
Nosy Hao (22°05’S, 43°11’E) (translated: Savage island or Lices island). This island was named Sancti Jacobi on the map of Sanuto in 1588. Furthermore Murder’s Island by W. F. W. Owen in 1824 because of the murder of 2 sailors by the inhabitants. 2,2 km length and 400 m wide , 5,5 km before Andavadoaka.
Nosy Iranja (translated: Turtle island] - northern Madagascar, 30 miles from Nosy Bé
Nosy Lava (21°44’S, 43°18’E) (translated: Long island) - 70 ha, height 16 m, near Morombe Temporaly inhabited by some fishermen.
Nosy Langobalana - small island near Nosy Hao, named also: île au Tombeau (Tombstone island). In 1824 two English sailors (Bowie and Parson) were buried here.. 
Nosy Manitse (25°13’S, 44°14’E) (translated: Perfumed island; other names: Ilha do Nascimento by the Portuguese,  île Leven by the English, par les Anglais. 110 ha, situated in the Bay of Ampalaza, not far away from the mouth of the Linta River. 
Nosy Mborona (25°04’S, 44°02’E) (translated: Bird's island) - in the Linta River's mouth.
Nosy Mivola (22°00’S, 43°14’E) (translated: island that speaks) - Cape Saint-Vincent.
Nosy Ratafanika (21°49’S, 43°17’E) small island at Cape Saint-Vincent.  Length approx. 2 km x 200m. Forms an archipelago with Nosy Fatra, Nosy Andriamandriaka and Nosy Andamonty.
Nosy Satrana (23°38’S, 43°42’E) (translated: Palm island) - uninhabited, 50 ha.
Nosy Tarafa - facing Tulear near Sarodrano.
Nosy Timpoy (21°46’S, 43°18’E) - south of Nosy Lava.
Nosy Tsarabanjina - northern Madagascar, near Nosy Mitsio. A lodge is situated on this island.
Nosy Vato  (between 23°14’S and 23’21’S, 43°42’E). Translated: Rock island  - mouth of Fiherenana river

References
 PETITE ENCYCLOPÉDIE DU GRAND SUD DE MADAGASCAR  | Jean-Michel Lebigre. Openeditions.org

Madagascar
 
Islands of the Indian Ocean
Islands